The 2010 Sporting Cristal season is the 55th season of the team's existence.

Squad

First-team squad
 .

Transfers

In

Out

Out on loan

Club

Management

Other information

Primera División Peruana

First stage

Results summary

Second stage
The Second Stage will begin September. Each winner of each Liguilla will qualify for the 2011 Copa Libertadores Second Stage.

Matches

First Stage

Second Stage

References

External links 
2009 Schedule

2010
Sporting Cristal